'''Chak 288 JB (Jaimal Singh) and Chak 285 JB'''  are villages of Toba Tek Singh District in the Punjab province of Pakistan.  Their postal code is 36101.

Neighbouring settlements include Randian and Bilasur. It is located at Gojra - Toba Tek Singh Road.

References 

Populated places in Toba Tek Singh District